NA-145 Khanewal-II is a constituency for the National Assembly of Pakistan.

Election 2002 

General elections were held on 10 Oct 2002. Hamid Yar Hiraj an Independent candidate won by 74,905 votes.

Election 2008 

General elections were held on 18 Feb 2008. Hamid Yar Hiraj of PML-Q won by 58,819 votes.

Election 2013 

General elections were held on 11 May 2013. Muhammad Khan Daha of PML-N won by 96,162 votes and became the  member of National Assembly.

Election 2018

See also
NA-144 Khanewal-I
NA-146 Khanewal-III

References

External links 
Election result's official website

NA-157